{{Taxobox
| name = 
| image = Garrulus glandarius 1 Luc Viatour.jpg
| image_width =
| image_caption = Eurasian jay (Garrulus glandarius)
| regnum = Animalia
| phylum = Chordata
| classis = Aves
| ordo = Passeriformes
| familia = Corvidae
| subdivision_ranks = Genera
| subdivision = 
Garrulus
Podoces
Ptilostomus'PerisoreusAphelocomaGymnorhinusCyanocittaCalocittaCyanocoraxCyanolyca}}

A jay is a member of a number of species of medium-sized, usually colorful and noisy, passerine birds in the crow family, Corvidae. The evolutionary relationships between the jays and the  magpies are rather complex. For example, the Eurasian magpie seems more closely related to the Eurasian jay than to the East Asian blue and green magpies, whereas the blue jay is not closely related to either.

Systematics and species
Jays are not a monophyletic group. Anatomical and molecular evidence indicates they can be divided into a New World and an Old World lineage (the latter including the ground jays and the piapiac), while the grey jays of the genus Perisoreus form a group of their own.  The black magpies, formerly believed to be related to jays, are classified as treepies.  

Old World ("brown") jays

Grey jays

New World jays

In culture

Slang
The word jay has an archaic meaning in American slang meaning a person who chatters impertinently. 

The term jaywalking'' was coined in 1915 to label persons crossing a busy street carelessly and becoming a traffic hazard. The term began to imply recklessness or impertinent behavior as the convention became established.

In January 2014, Canadian author Robert Joseph Greene embarked on a lobbying campaign among ornithologists in Europe and North America to get Merriam-Websters Dictionary to have a "Jabber of Jays" as an official term under bird groups.

References

External links
Jay videos on the Internet Bird Collection

Corvidae
Jays
Bird common names